Ashley Palmer may refer to:

 Ashley Palmer (footballer) (born 1992), English footballer
 Ashley Palmer (actress), American actress and singer